Greenwood (Dakota: čha-phežŋ; "wood [of] grass"), also known as Laflin, (c. 1885-after 1912), is a ghost town in Lawrence County, South Dakota, United States.
According to the book “Deadwood Saints and Sinners” by Jerry L. Bryant and Barbara Fifer, Robert Flormann died of pneumonia in Nome, Alaska, on July 4, 1900 and is buried in Seattle, page 168.

History
Greenwood was founded circa 1885 and was known for its mine. The town took its name from the green trees in the area. It included a store, school, stage barn, smithy, post office, livery stable, and boarding house. The mine was known for its gold production, though apparently, the mine turned no profit and only covered the cost of operations. Robert Flormann helped to promote the mine and became very wealthy. In 1912, the mine caught fire, and Flormann fell to his death while trying to rescue a survivor. In 1971, the last standing house in Greenwood was torn down. The foundations and the mine are all that remain.

Geography
Greenwood is located in the Black Hills in Lawrence County, South Dakota, United States at the coordinates . It is southwest of Boxelder Creek and the Black Hills & Fort Pierre Railroad.

References

Ghost towns in South Dakota
Geography of Lawrence County, South Dakota
Mining communities in South Dakota